Aravjun may refer to:
 Harabarjan
 Torkan, Yazd